This is a list of listed buildings in Greve Municipality, Denmark.

List

References

External links
 Danish Agency of Culture

 
Greve